Confessions of a Thug may refer to:

Confessions of a Thug (novel), an 1839 novel by Philip Meadows Taylor
Confessions of a Thug (film), a 2005 American film